Johann Heinrich Höhl (19 August 1904 – 26 March 1982) was a German painter. His work was part of the painting event in the art competition at the 1936 Summer Olympics.

References

1904 births
1982 deaths
20th-century German painters
20th-century German male artists
German male painters
Olympic competitors in art competitions
Artists from Frankfurt